Lampros Tairis (born 7 May 1993) is a Greek professional footballer who plays as a midfielder for Football League club Veria.

Honours
Veria
Gamma Ethniki: 2018–19

References

1993 births
Living people
Greek footballers
Football League (Greece) players
Gamma Ethniki players
Veria F.C. players
Association football midfielders